The Roger Revelle Medal is given out annually by the American Geophysical Union to recognize "outstanding accomplishments or contributions toward the understanding of the Earth’s atmospheric processes, including its dynamics, chemistry, and radiation; and toward the role of the atmosphere, atmosphere-ocean coupling, or atmosphere-land coupling in determining the climate, biogeochemical cycles, or other key elements of the climate system".  The award was created in 1991 and named after Roger Revelle.

Past recipients
The past recipients of the Roger Revelle Medal are:

2021 - Clara Deser

See also

 List of geophysicists
 List of geophysics awards
 Prizes named after people

References

American Geophysical Union awards
Awards established in 1991
1991 establishments in the United States